Arizona's 14th Legislative District is one of 30 in the state, covering all of Cochise and Greenlee counties, southern Graham County and a portion of Pima County. As of 2021, there are 94 precincts in the district, 49 in Cochise, 20 in Graham, 17 in Pima, and 8 in Greenlee, with a total registered voter population of 119,159. The district has an overall population of 220,225.

Political representation
The district is represented for the 2021–2022 Legislative Session in the State Senate by David Gowan (R) and in the House of Representatives by Lupe Diaz (R) and Gail Griffin (R).

References

Cochise County, Arizona
Graham County, Arizona
Greenlee County, Arizona
Pima County, Arizona
Arizona legislative districts